Francis Xavier Connor  (12 December 1917 - 27 December 2005) was an Australian jurist. 

Known professionally as Xavier Connor, he was Chair of the Victorian Bar Council from 1967 to 1969. He was appointed a Justice of the Supreme Court of the Australian Capital Territory in 1972 and was made a foundation judge of the Federal Court of Australia in 1977, serving on this court until 1982. 

Justice Connor served as President of the Australian Law Reform Commission from 1985 to 1987, President of the Courts-Martial Appeal Tribunal (1979), Chairman of the Parole Board of the ACT (1978-1985), Head of the Board of Inquiry into Casinos in Victoria (1982) and Chairman of the Committee of Review of the Special Broadcasting Service (1994).

See also
 Judiciary of Australia
 Victorian Bar

References

Judges of the Supreme Court of the Australian Capital Territory
Australian King's Counsel
Australian people of Irish descent
Officers of the Order of Australia
1917 births
2005 deaths
Judges of the Federal Court of Australia
People educated at Xavier College